The 17th Internationales ADAC-Eifelrennen was a non-championship Formula Two motor race held on 31 May 1953 at the Nürburgring circuit. The race was run over 7 laps of the circuit, and was won by Swiss driver Emmanuel de Graffenried in a Maserati A6GCM. de Graffenried also set fastest lap. Paul Frère finished second and Peter Collins third in their HWM-Altas.

Results

References

Eifelrennen
Eifelrennen
Eifelrennen